Alexei Nikolayevich Didenko (born March 30, 1983) is a Russian politician. From 2007 to 2010, he was deputy of the Tomsk Oblast Duma. Since 2011, he has been a deputy in the State Duma of the Russian Federation. He is a member of the Duma Committee on Constitutional Legislation and State Building. He is a leading member of the ultranationalist Liberal Democratic Party of Russia.

Early life
Alexei Didenko was born March 30, 1983 to Nikolai in the village of Pochapintsy in Cherkasy region of Ukraine. Alexei later moved with his family to Tomsk where he attended high school from 1990 to 1993. He graduated from “Russian classical school No. 2” in 2000.

Education
In 2005, Didenko graduated from the Law Institute of Tomsk State University. In the same year, he became of the coordinator of Tomsk regional branch of the Liberal Democratic Party of Russia

Member of parliament 
In 2016 election, Didenko won the Tomsk constituency No. 181. Earlier, TASS reported that LDPR concluded an agreement with United Russia that it will not nominate anyone in Tomsk to ease Didenko's election, and that the rector of Tomsk State University of Architecture and Construction Viktor Vlasov, winner of the United Russia primary, will not run for constituency.

In September 2017, Didenko ran for governor of Tomsk Oblast. He took second place, gaining 19.38% of the vote cast. Alexei Didenko headed the campaign headquarters of Vladimir Zhirinovsky in 2018 presidential election. On 30 March 2022 he was appointed first deputy chairman of the LDPR Central Office.

References

1983 births
Russian people of Ukrainian descent
Living people
People from Cherkasy Oblast
Liberal Democratic Party of Russia politicians
Tomsk State University alumni
21st-century Russian politicians
Sixth convocation members of the State Duma (Russian Federation)
Seventh convocation members of the State Duma (Russian Federation)
Eighth convocation members of the State Duma (Russian Federation)